Charles Dudley (born March 5, 1950) is an American retired professional basketball player born in Harrisburg, Pennsylvania.

A 6'2" guard from the University of Washington, Dudley played six seasons (1972–1973; 1974–1979) in the National Basketball Association as a member of the Seattle SuperSonics, Golden State Warriors, and Chicago Bulls.  He averaged 5.3 points per game and won an NBA Championship with Golden State in 1975.

References

External links

1950 births
Living people
African-American basketball players
Basketball players from Harrisburg, Pennsylvania
Chicago Bulls players
Golden State Warriors draft picks
Golden State Warriors players
Guards (basketball)
Moberly Greyhounds men's basketball players
Seattle SuperSonics players
Washington Huskies men's basketball players
American men's basketball players
21st-century African-American people
20th-century African-American sportspeople